Maurie Annese (born July 1971, Adelaide) is an Australian actor and producer.

He most recently starred in and co-produced I Can't Believe it's Not Countdown, it's a Musical Comedy, in collaboration with Brian Mannix and Crown Entertainment.

In 2002 during Melbourne’s Mid Summer Festival he produced the sell out hit musical “I Should Be So Luck” at Chapel Off Chapel in collaboration with writer, director and co-producer David Knox.

Recent television appearances include playing the character Sophos in Dead Gorgeous (2010), the Rush episode Freedom and as host in his own T.V show in 2004, The National Karaoke Challenge on SBS.

He has appeared in a number of films, most notably Bodymelt (1993), Love and Other Catastrophes(1996) and My Brother Jack(2001).

https://www.ausstage.edu.au/pages/event/14528

External links

I Can't Believe It's Not Countdown
National Karaoke Challenge
Love and Other Catastrophes
BodyMelt
My Brother Jack
Dead Gorgeous

1971 births
Living people
Male actors from Adelaide